Anthony Arena (born August 3, 1990) is an American soccer player.

Career

Youth and College
Arena played college soccer at Wake Forest University between 2009 and 2012.

While at college, Arena also spent time playing for USL PDL club's Washington Crossfire and Seattle Sounders FC U-23.

Professional
Arena was selected by Houston Dynamo with the 18th overall pick of the 2013 MLS Supplemental Draft. Arena signed with Houston in March 2013. He made his professional debut with Houston on May 29, 2013, in a US Open Cup game against FC Tucson. In 2014, Arena was loaned to the Pittsburgh Riverhounds as part of an affiliation between the two clubs. In total, Arena made 16 appearances during the loan and was named the club's Defensive Player of the Season after making a late play-off push. After being released by the Dynamo following the 2014 MLS season, Arena returned to the Pittsburgh and signed for the Riverhounds for the 2015 USL season.

International
Arena has represented the United States at the U18 and U20 levels.

References

External links
 
 Wake Forest profile
 

1990 births
Living people
American soccer players
Wake Forest Demon Deacons men's soccer players
Washington Crossfire players
Seattle Sounders FC U-23 players
Houston Dynamo FC players
People from Kenmore, Washington
Pittsburgh Riverhounds SC players
Soccer players from Washington (state)
Sportspeople from King County, Washington
USL League Two players
Major League Soccer players
USL Championship players
Houston Dynamo FC draft picks
United States men's youth international soccer players
Association football defenders